Uwe Benter (born 1 December 1955) is a German coxswain who competed for West Germany in the 1972 Summer Olympics.

He was born in Frankfurt am Main in 1955 and is the younger brother of Lutz Benter (born 1945), also an Olympic rower. He won a gold medal at the 1971 European Rowing Championships in Copenhagen with the coxed four. At the 1972 Summer Olympics, he was the cox of the West German boat that won the gold medal in the coxed four event. At the 1974 World Rowing Championships in Lucerne, he won bronze with the coxed four.

References 

1955 births
Living people
Coxswains (rowing)
Olympic rowers of West Germany
Rowers at the 1972 Summer Olympics
Olympic gold medalists for West Germany
Rowers from Frankfurt
Olympic medalists in rowing
West German male rowers
World Rowing Championships medalists for West Germany
Medalists at the 1972 Summer Olympics
European Rowing Championships medalists